This is a timeline of Albanian history, comprising important legal and territorial changes and political events in Albania and its predecessor states.  To read about the background to these events, see History of Albania.  See also the list of Albanian monarchs and list of heads of state of Albania.

Antiquity

2nd century AD to 12th century

13th century

14th century

15th century

16th century 

Ottomans ruled over Albanian territory.

17th century

18th century

19th century

20th century

21st century

See also
 Timeline of Tirana
 List of years in Albania

References 

Attribution:
 Data as of 1993.

Bibliography

 
 
 
 Afrim Krasniqi: The End of Albania's Siberia. Tirana 1998.
 
 
 
 Afrim Krasniqi: Civil Society in Albania. Tirana 2004.
 Afrim Krasniqi: Political Parties in Albania 1920–2006.Tirana 2006.

External links
 

Albania history-related lists
Albanian
Years in Albania